The Silverton Appeal Tribune was a weekly newspaper published in Silverton in the U.S. state of Oregon. It was published by the Statesman Journal; both papers, along with the nearby Stayton Mail, are owned by the national Gannett Company.

History 
The first newspaper in Silverton, the Appeal was founded as a weekly newspaper in 1880 by Henry G. Guild. Author Homer Davenport, who was raised in Silverton, had strong ties to the Appeal in his youth; he discussed its early days in his autobiographical work The Country Boy (1910), and described Guild as the "best editor the Silverton Appeal ever had."

The paper changed hands a number of times in its first few decades. In 1903, the paper acquired the Silvertonian and merged the two. The Tribune was founded in nearby Mount Angel in 1913, later moved to Silverton, and was ultimately acquired by Appeal owner John T. Hoblitt, who consolidated the papers in 1931. In 1976 the Mount Angel News was merged into the Appeal-Tribune.

At one time the printing press for the Appeal was located in Silverton's historic Ames Building, which was redeveloped in 2016. 

Gannet discontinued the Appeal Tribune as of Sept. 14, 2022.

Awards 
The paper has won multiple awards from the Oregon Newspaper Publishers Association's Better Newspaper Contest.

References

External links 
 Archives: 1999 - present

Silverton, Oregon
Newspapers published in Oregon
Publications established in 1880
1880 establishments in Oregon
Defunct newspapers published in Oregon
2022 disestablishments in Oregon
Publications disestablished in 2022